Boris Leonidovich Pasternak (30 May 1960) was a Russian poet, novelist, composer, and literary translator. Composed in 1917, Pasternak's first book of poems, My Sister, Life, was published in Berlin in 1922 and soon became an important collection in the Russian language. Pasternak's translations of stage plays by Goethe, Schiller, Calderón de la Barca and Shakespeare remain very popular with Russian audiences.

Pasternak was the author of Doctor Zhivago (1957), a novel that takes place between the Russian Revolution of 1905 and the Second World War. Doctor Zhivago was rejected for publication in the USSR, but the manuscript was smuggled to Italy and was first published there in 1957. Pasternak was awarded the Nobel Prize in Literature in 1958, an event that enraged the Communist Party of the Soviet Union, which forced him to decline the prize. In 1989, Pasternak's son Yevgeny finally accepted the award on his father's behalf. Doctor Zhivago has been part of the main Russian school curriculum since 2003.

Early life

Pasternak was born in Moscow on 10 February (Gregorian), 1890 (29 January, Julian) into a wealthy, assimilated Jewish family. His father was the post-Impressionist painter Leonid Pasternak, who taught as a professor at the Moscow School of Painting, Sculpture, and Architecture. His mother was Rosa Kaufman, a concert pianist and the daughter of Odessa industrialist Isadore Kaufman and his wife. Pasternak had a younger brother, Alex, and two sisters, Lydia and Josephine. The family claimed descent on the paternal line from Isaac Abarbanel, the famous 15th-century Sephardic Jewish philosopher, Bible commentator, and treasurer of Portugal.

Early education 
From 1904 to 1907, Boris Pasternak was the cloister-mate of Peter Minchakievich (1890–1963) in Holy Dormition Pochayiv Lavra, in Western Ukraine. Minchakievich came from an Orthodox Ukrainian family and Pasternak came from a Jewish family. Some confusion has arisen as to Pasternak attending a military academy in his boyhood years. The uniforms of their monastery Cadet Corp were only similar to those of The Czar Alexander the Third Military Academy, as Pasternak and Minchakievich never attended any military academy. Most schools used a distinctive military-looking uniform particular to them as was the custom of the time in Eastern Europe and Russia. Boyhood friends, they parted in 1908, friendly but with different politics, never to see each other again. Pasternak went to the Moscow Conservatory to study music (later Germany to study philosophy), and Minchakievich went to Lviv University to study history and philosophy. The good dimension of the character Strelnikov in Dr. Zhivago is based upon Peter Minchakievich. Several of Pasternak's characters are composites. After World War One and the Revolution, fighting for the Provisional or Republican government under Kerensky, and then escaping a Communist jail and execution, Minchakievich trekked across Siberia in 1917 and became an American citizen. Pasternak stayed in Russia.

In a 1959 letter to Jacqueline de Proyart, Pasternak recalled:

Shortly after his birth, Pasternak's parents had joined the Tolstoyan Movement. Novelist Leo Tolstoy was a close family friend, as Pasternak recalled, "my father illustrated his books, went to see him, revered him, and ...the whole house was imbued with his spirit."

In a 1956 essay, Pasternak recalled his father's feverish work creating illustrations for Tolstoy's novel Resurrection. The novel was serialized in the journal Niva by the publisher Fyodor Marx, based in St Petersburg. The sketches were drawn from observations in such places as courtrooms, prisons and on trains, in a spirit of realism. To ensure that the sketches met the journal deadline, train conductors were enlisted to personally collect the illustrations. Pasternak wrote,

According to Max Hayward, "In November 1910, when Tolstoy fled from his home and died in the stationmaster's house at Astapovo, Leonid Pasternak was informed by telegram and he went there immediately, taking his son Boris with him, and made a drawing of Tolstoy on his deathbed."

Regular visitors to the Pasternaks' home also included Sergei Rachmaninoff, Alexander Scriabin, Lev Shestov, Rainer Maria Rilke. Pasternak aspired first to be a musician. Inspired by Scriabin, Pasternak briefly was a student at the Moscow Conservatory. In 1910 he abruptly left for the German University of Marburg, where he studied under Neo-Kantian philosophers Hermann Cohen, Nicolai Hartmann and Paul Natorp.

Life and career

Olga Freidenberg 
In 1910 Pasternak was reunited with his cousin Olga Freidenberg (1890–1955). They had shared the same nursery but been separated when the Freidenberg family moved to Saint Petersburg. They fell in love immediately but were never lovers. The romance, however, is made clear from their letters, Pasternak writing:You do not know how my tormenting feeling grew and grew until it became obvious to me and to others. As you walked beside me with complete detachment, I could not express it to you. It was a rare sort of closeness, as if we two, you and I, were in love with something that was utterly indifferent to both of us, something that remained aloof from us by virtue of its extraordinary inability to adapt to the other side of life.The cousins' initial passion developed into a lifelong close friendship. From 1910 Pasternak and Freidenberg exchanged frequent letters, and their correspondence lasted over 40 years until 1954. The cousins last met in 1936.

Ida Wissotzkaya 

Pasternak fell in love with Ida Wissotzkaya, a girl from a notable Moscow Jewish family of tea merchants, whose company Wissotzky Tea was the largest tea company in the world. Pasternak had tutored her in the final class of high school. He helped her prepare for finals. They met in Marburg during the summer of 1912 when Boris' father, Leonid Pasternak, painted her portrait.

Although Professor Cohen encouraged him to remain in Germany and to pursue a Philosophy doctorate, Pasternak decided against it. He returned to Moscow around the time of the outbreak of the First World War. In the aftermath of events, Pasternak proposed marriage to Ida. However, the Wissotzky family was disturbed by Pasternak's poor prospects and persuaded Ida to refuse him. She turned him down and he told of his love and rejection in the poem "Marburg" (1917):

I quivered. I flared up, and then was extinguished.
I shook. I had made a proposal—but late,
Too late. I was scared, and she had refused me.
I pity her tears, am more blessed than a saint.

Around this time, when he was back in Russia, he joined the Russian Futurist group Centrifuge  (Tsentrifuga)  as a pianist: poetry was just a hobby for him then. It was in their group journal, Lirika, where some of his earliest poems were published. His involvement with the Futurist movement as a whole reached its peak when, in 1914, he published a satirical article in Rukonog, which attacked the jealous leader of the "Mezzanine of Poetry", Vadim Shershenevich, who was criticizing Lirika and the Ego-Futurists because Shershenevich himself was barred from collaborating with Centrifuge, the reason being that he was such a talentless poet. The action eventually caused a verbal battle amongst several members of the groups, fighting for recognition as the first, truest Russian Futurists; these included the Cubo-Futurists, who were by that time already notorious for their scandalous behaviour. Pasternak's first and second books of poetry were published shortly after these events.

Another failed love affair in 1917 inspired the poems in his third and first major book, My Sister, Life. His early verse cleverly dissimulates his preoccupation with Immanuel Kant's philosophy. Its fabric includes striking alliterations, wild rhythmic combinations, day-to-day vocabulary, and hidden allusions to his favourite poets such as Rilke, Lermontov, Pushkin and German-language Romantic poets.

During World War I, Pasternak taught and worked at a chemical factory in Vsevolodo-Vilva near Perm, which undoubtedly provided him with material for Dr. Zhivago many years later. Unlike the rest of his family and many of his closest friends, Pasternak chose not to leave Russia after the October Revolution of 1917. According to Max Hayward,

When it finally was published in 1922, Pasternak's My Sister, Life revolutionised Russian poetry. It made Pasternak the model for younger poets, and decisively changed the poetry of Osip Mandelshtam, Marina Tsvetayeva and others.

Following My Sister, Life, Pasternak produced some hermetic pieces of uneven quality, including his masterpiece, the lyric cycle Rupture (1921). Both Pro-Soviet writers and their White émigré equivalents applauded Pasternak's poetry as pure, unbridled inspiration.

In the late 1920s, he also participated in the much celebrated tripartite correspondence with Rilke and Tsvetayeva. As the 1920s wore on, however, Pasternak increasingly felt that his colourful style was at odds with a less educated readership. He attempted to make his poetry more comprehensible by reworking his earlier pieces and starting two lengthy poems on the Russian Revolution of 1905. He also turned to prose and wrote several autobiographical stories, notably "The Childhood of Luvers" and "Safe Conduct". (The collection Zhenia's Childhood and Other Stories would be published in 1982.)

In 1922 Pasternak married Evgeniya Lurye (Евгения Лурье), a student at the Art Institute. The following year their son Yevgenii was born.

Evidence of Pasternak's support of still-revolutionary members of the leadership of the Communist Party as late as 1926 is indicated by his poem "In Memory of Reissner" presumably written upon the premature death from typhus of Bolshevik leader Larisa Reisner aged 30 in February of that year.

By 1927, Pasternak's close friends Vladimir Mayakovsky and Nikolai Aseyev were advocating the complete subordination of the arts to the needs of the Communist Party of the Soviet Union. In a letter to his sister Josephine, Pasternak wrote of his intentions to "break off relations" with both of them. Although he expressed that it would be deeply painful, Pasternak explained that it could not be prevented. He explained:

By 1932, Pasternak had strikingly reshaped his style to make it more understandable to the general public and printed the new collection of poems, aptly titled The Second Birth. Although its Caucasian pieces were as brilliant as the earlier efforts, the book alienated the core of Pasternak's refined audience abroad, which was largely composed of anti-communist émigrés.

In 1932 Pasternak fell in love with Zinaida Neuhaus, the wife of the Russian pianist Heinrich Neuhaus. They both got divorces and married two years later.

He continued to change his poetry, simplifying his style and language through the years, as expressed in his next book, Early Trains (1943).

Stalin Epigram
In April 1934 Osip Mandelstam recited his "Stalin Epigram" to Pasternak. After listening, Pasternak told Mandelstam: "I didn't hear this, you didn't recite it to me, because, you know, very strange and terrible things are happening now: they've begun to pick people up. I'm afraid the walls have ears and perhaps even these benches on the boulevard here may be able to listen and tell tales. So let's make out that I heard nothing."

On the night of 14 May 1934, Mandelstam was arrested at his home based on a warrant signed by NKVD boss Genrikh Yagoda. Devastated, Pasternak went immediately to the offices of Izvestia and begged Nikolai Bukharin to intercede on Mandelstam's behalf.

Soon after his meeting with Bukharin, the telephone rang in Pasternak's Moscow apartment. A voice from the Kremlin said, "Comrade Stalin wishes to speak with you." According to Ivinskaya, Pasternak was struck dumb. "He was totally unprepared for such a conversation. But then he heard his voice, the voice of Stalin, coming over the line. The Leader addressed him in a rather bluff uncouth fashion, using the familiar thou form: 'Tell me, what are they saying in your literary circles about the arrest of Mandelstam?'" Flustered, Pasternak denied that there was any discussion or that there were any literary circles left in Soviet Russia. Stalin went on to ask him for his own opinion of Mandelstam. In an "eager fumbling manner" Pasternak explained that he and Mandelstam each had a completely different philosophy about poetry. Stalin finally said, in a mocking tone of voice: "I see, you just aren't able to stick up for a comrade", and put down the receiver.

Great Purge

According to Pasternak, during the 1937 show trial of General Iona Yakir and Marshal Mikhail Tukhachevsky, the Union of Soviet Writers requested all members to add their names to a statement supporting the death penalty for the defendants. Pasternak refused to sign, even after leadership of the Union visited and threatened him.
Soon after, Pasternak appealed directly to Stalin, describing his family's strong Tolstoyan convictions and putting his own life at Stalin's disposal; he said that he could not stand as a self-appointed judge of life and death. Pasternak was certain that he would be arrested, but instead Stalin is said to have crossed Pasternak's name off an execution list, reportedly declaring, "Do not touch this cloud dweller" (or, in another version, "Leave that holy fool alone!").

Pasternak's close friend Titsian Tabidze did fall victim to the Great Purge. In an autobiographical essay published in the 1950s, Pasternak described the execution of Tabidze and the suicides of Marina Tsvetaeva and Paolo Iashvili as the greatest heartbreaks of his life.

Ivinskaya wrote, "I believe that between Stalin and Pasternak there was an incredible, silent duel."

World War II
When the Luftwaffe began bombing Moscow, Pasternak immediately began to serve as a fire warden on the roof of the writer's building on Lavrushinski Street. According to Ivinskaya, he repeatedly helped to dispose of German bombs which fell on it.

In 1943, Pasternak was finally granted permission to visit the soldiers at the front. He bore it well, considering the hardships of the journey (he had a weak leg from an old injury), and he wanted to go to the most dangerous places. He read his poetry and talked extensively with the active and injured troops.

With the end of the war in 1945, the Soviet people expected to see the end of the devastation of Nazism, and hoped for the end of Stalin's purges. But sealed trains began carrying large numbers of prisoners to the Soviet Gulags. Some were Nazi collaborators who had fought under General Andrey Vlasov, but most were ordinary Soviet officers and men. Pasternak watched as ex-POWs were directly transferred from Nazi Germany to Soviet concentration camps. White émigrés who had returned due to pledges of amnesty were also sent directly to the Gulag, as were Jews from the Anti-Fascist Committee and other organizations. Many thousands of innocent people were incarcerated in connection with the Leningrad affair and the so-called doctors' plot, while whole ethnic groups were deported to Siberia.

Pasternak later said, "If, in a bad dream, we had seen all the horrors in store for us after the war, we should not have been sorry to see Stalin fall, together with Hitler. Then, an end to the war in favour of our allies, civilized countries with democratic traditions, would have meant a hundred times less suffering for our people than that which Stalin again inflicted on it after his victory."

Olga Ivinskaya
In October 1946, the twice-married Pasternak met Olga Ivinskaya, a 34 year old single mother employed by Novy Mir. Deeply moved by her resemblance to his first love Ida Vysotskaya, Pasternak gave Ivinskaya several volumes of his poetry and literary translations. Although Pasternak never left his wife Zinaida, he started an extramarital relationship with Ivinskaya that would last for the remainder of Pasternak's life. Ivinskaya later recalled, "He phoned almost every day and, instinctively fearing to meet or talk with him, yet dying of happiness, I would stammer out that I was 'busy today.' But almost every afternoon, toward the end of working hours, he came in person to the office and often walked with me through the streets, boulevards, and squares all the way home to Potapov Street. 'Shall I make you a present of this square?' he would ask."

She gave him the phone number of her neighbour Olga Volkova who resided below. In the evenings, Pasternak would phone and Volkova would signal by Olga banging on the water pipe which connected their apartments.

When they first met, Pasternak was translating the verse of the Hungarian national poet, Sándor Petőfi. Pasternak gave his lover a book of Petőfi with the inscription, "Petőfi served as a code in May and June 1947, and my close translations of his lyrics are an expression, adapted to the requirements of the text, of my feelings and thoughts for you and about you. In memory of it all, B.P., 13 May 1948."

Pasternak later noted on a photograph of himself: "Petőfi is magnificent with his descriptive lyrics and picture of nature, but you are better still. I worked on him a good deal in 1947 and 1948, when I first came to know you. Thank you for your help. I was translating both of you." Ivinskaya would later describe the Petőfi translations as "a first declaration of love".

According to Ivinskaya, Zinaida Pasternak was infuriated by her husband's infidelity. Once, when his younger son Leonid fell seriously ill, Zinaida extracted a promise from her husband, as they stood by the boy's sickbed, that he would end his affair with Ivinskaya. Pasternak asked Luisa Popova, a mutual friend, to tell Ivinskaya about his promise. Popova told him that he must do it himself. Soon after, Ivinskaya happened to be ill at Popova's apartment, when suddenly Zinaida Pasternak arrived and confronted her.

Ivinskaya later recalled,

In 1948, Pasternak advised Ivinskaya to resign her job at Novy Mir, which was becoming extremely difficult due to their relationship. In the aftermath, Pasternak began to instruct her in translating poetry. In time, they began to refer to her apartment on Potapov Street as, "Our Shop."

On the evening of 6 October 1949, Ivinskaya was arrested at her apartment by the KGB. Ivinskaya relates in her memoirs that, when the agents burst into her apartment, she was at her typewriter working on translations of the Korean poet Won Tu-Son. Her apartment was ransacked and all items connected with Pasternak were piled up in her presence. Ivinskaya was taken to the Lubyanka Prison and repeatedly interrogated, where she refused to say anything incriminating about Pasternak. At the time, she was pregnant with Pasternak's child and had a miscarriage early in her ten-year sentence in the GULAG.

Upon learning of his mistress' arrest, Pasternak telephoned Liuisa Popova and asked her to come at once to Gogol Boulevard. She found him sitting on a bench near the Palace of Soviets Metro Station. Weeping, Pasternak told her, "Everything is finished now. They've taken her away from me and I'll never see her again. It's like death, even worse."

According to Ivinskaya, "After this, in conversation with people he scarcely knew, he always referred to Stalin as a 'murderer.' Talking with people in the offices of literary periodicals, he often asked: 'When will there be an end to this freedom for lackeys who happily walk over corpses to further their own interests?' He spent a good deal of time with Akhmatova—who in those years was given a very wide berth by most of the people who knew her. He worked intensively on the second part of Doctor Zhivago."

In a 1958 letter to a friend in West Germany, Pasternak wrote, "She was put in jail on my account, as the person considered by the secret police to be closest to me, and they hoped that by means of a gruelling interrogation and threats they could extract enough evidence from her to put me on trial. I owe my life, and the fact that they did not touch me in those years, to her heroism and endurance."

Translating Goethe
Pasternak's translation of the first part of Faust led him to be attacked in the August 1950 edition of Novy Mir. The critic accused Pasternak of distorting Goethe's "progressive" meanings to support "the reactionary theory of 'pure art'", as well as introducing aesthetic and individualist values. In a subsequent letter to the daughter of Marina Tsvetaeva, Pasternak explained that the attack was motivated by the fact that the supernatural elements of the play, which Novy Mir considered, "irrational," had been translated as Goethe had written them. Pasternak further declared that, despite the attacks on his translation, his contract for the second part had not been revoked.

Khrushchev thaw
When Stalin died of a stroke on 5 March 1953, Ivinskaya was still imprisoned in the Gulag, and Pasternak was in Moscow. Across the nation, there were waves of panic, confusion, and public displays of grief. Pasternak wrote, "Men who are not free... always idealize their bondage."

After her release, Pasternak's relationship with Ivinskaya picked up where it had left off. Soon after he confided in her, "For so long we were ruled over by a madman and a murderer, and now by a fool and a pig. The madman had his occasional flights of fancy, he had an intuitive feeling for certain things, despite his wild obscurantism. Now we are ruled over by mediocrities." During this period, Pasternak delighted in reading a clandestine copy of George Orwell's Animal Farm in English. In conversation with Ivinskaya, Pasternak explained that the pig dictator Napoleon, in the novel, "vividly reminded" him of Soviet Premier Nikita Khrushchev.

Doctor Zhivago

Although it contains passages written in the 1910s and 1920s, Doctor Zhivago was not completed until 1955. Pasternak submitted the novel to Novy Mir in 1956, which refused publication due to its rejection of socialist realism. The author, like his protagonist Yuri Zhivago, showed more concern for the welfare of individual characters than for the "progress" of society. Censors also regarded some passages as anti-Soviet, especially the novel's criticisms of Stalinism, Collectivisation, the Great Purge, and the Gulag.

Pasternak's fortunes were soon to change, however. In March 1956, the Italian Communist Party sent a journalist, Sergio D'Angelo, to work in the Soviet Union, and his status as a journalist as well as his membership in the Italian Communist Party allowed him to have access to various aspects of the cultural life in Moscow at the time. A Milan publisher, the communist Giangiacomo Feltrinelli, had also given him a commission to find new works of Soviet literature that would be appealing to Western audiences, and upon learning of Doctor Zhivagos existence, D'Angelo travelled immediately to Peredelkino and offered to submit Pasternak's novel to Feltrinelli's company for publication. At first Pasternak was stunned. Then he brought the manuscript from his study and told D'Angelo with a laugh, "You are hereby invited to watch me face the firing squad."

According to Lazar Fleishman, Pasternak was aware that he was taking a huge risk. No Soviet author had attempted to deal with Western publishers since the 1920s, when such behavior led the Soviet State to declare war on Boris Pilnyak and Evgeny Zamyatin. Pasternak, however, believed that Feltrinelli's Communist affiliation would not only guarantee publication, but might even force the Soviet State to publish the novel in Russia.

In a rare moment of agreement, both Olga Ivinskaya and Zinaida Pasternak were horrified by the submission of Doctor Zhivago to a Western publishing house. Pasternak, however, refused to change his mind and informed an emissary from Feltrinelli that he was prepared to undergo any sacrifice in order to see Doctor Zhivago published.

In 1957, Feltrinelli announced that the novel would be published by his company. Despite repeated demands from visiting Soviet emissaries, Feltrinelli refused to cancel or delay publication. According to Ivinskaya, "He did not believe that we would ever publish the manuscript here and felt he had no right to withhold a masterpiece from the world – this would be an even greater crime." The Soviet government forced Pasternak to cable the publisher to withdraw the manuscript, but he sent separate, secret letters advising Feltrinelli to ignore the telegrams.

Helped considerably by the Soviet campaign against the novel (as well as by the U.S. Central Intelligence Agency's secret purchase of hundreds of copies of the book as it came off the presses around the world – see "Nobel Prize" section below), Doctor Zhivago became an instant sensation throughout the non-Communist world upon its release in November 1957. In the State of Israel, however, Pasternak's novel was sharply criticized for its assimilationist views towards the Jewish people. When informed of this, Pasternak responded, "No matter. I am above race..." According to Lazar Fleishman, Pasternak had written the disputed passages prior to Israeli independence. At the time, Pasternak had also been regularly attending Russian Orthodox Divine Liturgy. Therefore, he believed that Soviet Jews converting to Christianity was preferable to assimilating into atheism and Stalinism.

The first English translation of Doctor Zhivago was hastily produced by Max Hayward and Manya Harari in order to coincide with overwhelming public demand. It was released in August 1958, and remained the only edition available for more than fifty years. Between 1958 and 1959, the English language edition spent 26 weeks at the top of The New York Times''' bestseller list.

Ivinskaya's daughter Irina circulated typed copies of the novel in Samizdat. Although no Soviet critics had read the banned novel, Doctor Zhivago was pilloried in the State-owned press. Similar attacks led to a humorous Russian saying, "I haven't read Pasternak, but I condemn him".

During the aftermath of the Second World War, Pasternak had composed a series of poems on Gospel themes. According to Ivinskaya, Pasternak had regarded Stalin as a "giant of the pre-Christian era." Therefore, Pasternak's decision to write Christian poetry was "a form of protest".

On 9 September 1958, the Literary Gazette critic Viktor Pertsov retaliated by denouncing "the decadent religious poetry of Pasternak, which reeks of mothballs from the Symbolist suitcase of 1908–10 manufacture." Furthermore, the author received much hate mail from Communists both at home and abroad. According to Ivinskaya, Pasternak continued to receive such letters for the remainder of his life.

In a letter written to his sister Josephine, however, Pasternak recalled the words of his friend Ekaterina Krashennikova upon reading Doctor Zhivago. She had said, "Don't forget yourself to the point of believing that it was you who wrote this work. It was the Russian people and their sufferings who created it. Thank God for having expressed it through your pen."

Nobel Prize

According to Yevgeni Borisovich Pasternak, "Rumors that Pasternak was to receive the Nobel Prize started right after the end of World War II. According to the former Nobel Committee head Lars Gyllensten, his nomination was discussed every year from 1946 to 1950, then again in 1957 (it was finally awarded in 1958). Pasternak guessed at this from the growing waves of criticism in USSR. Sometimes he had to justify his European fame: 'According to the Union of Soviet Writers, some literature circles of the West see unusual importance in my work, not matching its modesty and low productivity…'

Meanwhile, Pasternak wrote to Renate Schweitzer and his sister, Lydia Pasternak Slater. In both letters, the author expressed hope that he would be passed over by the Nobel Committee in favour of Alberto Moravia. Pasternak wrote that he was wracked with torments and anxieties at the thought of placing his loved ones in danger.

On 23 October 1958, Boris Pasternak was announced as the winner of the Nobel Prize. The citation credited Pasternak's contribution to Russian lyric poetry and for his role in "continuing the great Russian epic tradition." On 25 October, Pasternak sent a telegram to the Swedish Academy: "Infinitely grateful, touched, proud, surprised, overwhelmed." That same day, the Literary Institute in Moscow demanded that all its students sign a petition denouncing Pasternak and his novel. They were further ordered to join a "spontaneous" demonstration demanding Pasternak's exile from the Soviet Union. Also on that day, the Literary Gazette published a letter which was sent to B. Pasternak in September 1956 by the editors of the Soviet literary journal Novy Mir to justify their rejection of Doctor Zhivago. In publishing this letter the Soviet authorities wished to justify the measures they had taken against the author and his work. On 26 October, the Literary Gazette ran an article by David Zaslavski entitled, Reactionary Propaganda Uproar over a Literary Weed.

According to Solomon Volkov:

Furthermore, Pasternak was informed that, if he traveled to Stockholm to collect his Nobel Medal, he would be refused re-entry to the Soviet Union. As a result, on 29 October Pasternak sent a second telegram to the Nobel Committee: "In view of the meaning given the award by the society in which I live, I must renounce this undeserved distinction which has been conferred on me. Please do not take my voluntary renunciation amiss." The Swedish Academy announced: "This refusal, of course, in no way alters the validity of the award. There remains only for the Academy, however, to announce with regret that the presentation of the Prize cannot take place."
According to Yevgenii Pasternak, "I couldn't recognize my father when I saw him that evening. Pale, lifeless face, tired painful eyes, and only speaking about the same thing: 'Now it all doesn’t matter, I declined the Prize.

Deportation plans
Despite his decision to decline the award, the Soviet Union of Writers continued to demonise Pasternak in the State-owned press. Furthermore, he was threatened at the very least with formal exile to the West. In response, Pasternak wrote directly to Soviet Premier Nikita Khrushchev,

In The Oak and the Calf, Alexander Solzhenitsyn sharply criticized Pasternak, both for declining the Nobel Prize and for sending such a letter to Khrushchev. In her own memoirs, Olga Ivinskaya blames herself for pressuring her lover into making both decisions.

According to Yevgenii Pasternak, "She accused herself bitterly for persuading Pasternak to decline the Prize. After all that had happened, open shadowing, friends turning away, Pasternak's suicidal condition at the time, one can... understand her: the memory of Stalin's camps was too fresh, [and] she tried to protect him."

On 31 October 1958, the Union of Soviet Writers held a trial behind closed doors. According to the meeting minutes, Pasternak was denounced as an internal émigré and a Fascist fifth columnist. Afterwards, the attendees announced that Pasternak had been expelled from the Union. They further signed a petition to the Politburo, demanding that Pasternak be stripped of his Soviet citizenship and exiled to "his Capitalist paradise." According to Yevgenii Pasternak, however, author Konstantin Paustovsky refused to attend the meeting. Yevgeny Yevtushenko did attend, but walked out in disgust.

According to Yevgenii Pasternak, his father would have been exiled had it not been for Indian Prime Minister Jawaharlal Nehru, who telephoned Khrushchev and threatened to organize a Committee for Pasternak's protection.

It is possible that the 1958 Nobel Prize prevented Pasternak's imprisonment due to the Soviet State's fear of international protests. Yevgenii Pasternak believes, however, that the resulting persecution fatally weakened his father's health.

Meanwhile, Bill Mauldin produced a cartoon about Pasternak that won the 1959 Pulitzer Prize for Editorial Cartooning. The cartoon depicts Pasternak as a GULAG inmate splitting trees in the snow, saying to another inmate: "I won the Nobel Prize for Literature. What was your crime?"

Last years

Pasternak's post-Zhivago poetry probes the universal questions of love, immortality, and reconciliation with God.Conference set on Doctor Zhivago writer (Stanford Report, 28 April 2004). Boris Pasternak wrote his last complete book, When the Weather Clears, in 1959.

According to Ivinskaya, Pasternak continued to stick to his daily writing schedule even during the controversy over Doctor Zhivago. He also continued translating the writings of Juliusz Słowacki and Pedro Calderón de la Barca. In his work on Calderon, Pasternak received the discreet support of Nikolai Mikhailovich Liubimov, a senior figure in the Party's literary apparatus. Ivinskaya describes Liubimov as, "a shrewd and enlightened person who understood very well that all the mudslinging and commotion over the novel would be forgotten, but that there would always be a Pasternak." In a letter to his sisters in Oxford, England, Pasternak claimed to have finished translating one of Calderon's plays in less than a week.

During the summer of 1959, Pasternak began writing The Blind Beauty, a trilogy of stage plays set before and after Alexander II's abolition of serfdom in Russia. In an interview with Olga Carlisle from The Paris Review, Pasternak enthusiastically described the play's plot and characters. He informed Olga Carlisle that, at the end of The Blind Beauty, he wished to depict "the birth of an enlightened and affluent middle class, open to occidental influences, progressive, intelligent, artistic". However, Pasternak fell ill with terminal lung cancer before he could complete the first play of the trilogy.

"Unique Days"
"Unique Days" was the last poem Pasternak wrote.

Death

Boris Pasternak died of lung cancer in his dacha in Peredelkino on the evening of 30 May 1960. He first summoned his sons, and in their presence said, "Who will suffer most because of my death? Who will suffer most? Only Oliusha will, and I haven't had time to do anything for her. The worst thing is that she will suffer." Pasternak's last words were, "I can't hear very well. And there's a mist in front of my eyes. But it will go away, won't it? Don't forget to open the window tomorrow."

Funeral demonstration
Despite only a small notice appearing in the Literary Gazette, handwritten notices carrying the date and time of the funeral were posted throughout the Moscow subway system. As a result, thousands of admirers braved Militia and KGB surveillance to attend Pasternak's funeral in Peredelkino.

Before Pasternak's civil funeral, Ivinskaya had a conversation with Konstantin Paustovsky. According to her,

Then, in the presence of a large number of foreign journalists, the body of Pasternak was removed to the cemetery. According to Ivinskaya,

To the horror of the assembled Party officials, however, someone with "a young and deeply anguished voice" began reciting Pasternak's banned poem Hamlet.

According to Ivinskaya,

The final speaker at the graveside service said,

As the spectators cheered, the bells of Peredelkino's Church of the Transfiguration began to toll. Written prayers for the dead were then placed upon Pasternak's forehead and the coffin was closed and buried. Pasternak's gravesite would go on to become a major shrine for members of the Soviet dissident movement.

Modern research about the CIA role in the 1958 Nobel Prize

Writer and Radio Liberty journalist Ivan Tolstoy wrote the book The Laundered Novel: Doctor Zhivago between the KGB and the CIA, published in Russia in December 2008.

Ivan Tolstoy said in his book that the British MI6 and the American CIA allegedly lent a hand to ensure Doctor Zhivago was submitted to the Nobel Committee in the original Russian. According to Tolstoy, this was allegedly done so that Pasternak could win the Nobel Prize and harm the international credibility of the Soviet Union. He repeats and elaborates upon Feltrinelli's claims that the CIA operatives had photographed a manuscript of the novel and secretly printed a small number of books in the Russian language.

Ivan Tolstoy explained on a Russian radio program Echo of Moscow, aired on 7 December 2008, his research about whether the Central Intelligence Agency helped Pasternak win the Nobel Prize. He said "...possibly, because of the publication of this CIA's Russian edition, Pasternak received the Nobel Prize. I emphasize — it is possible! These documents do not exist. I suppose he got it, after all, because of the CIA edition. But I stipulate this very carefully."

Anna Sergeyeva-Klyatis, a Russian philologist, published her research in 2012, where she suggested that the first Russian edition of Doctor Zhivago, which was a pirated version with numerous typographical errors and omissions, was actually initiated by the Central Association of Postwar Émigrés, in response to a growing demand among Russian émigrés.

On 14 April 2014, The Central Intelligence Agency declassified more than 130 documents of files about 1,000 Russian copies published by the Mouton Publishers of the Hague early September 1958. In one of the files, dated 12 December 1957, the CIA agents recommend: "Dr. Zhivago should be published in a maximum number of foreign editions, for maximum free world discussion and acclaim and consideration for such honor as the Nobel prize". [sic]

In its announcement of the declassification of the Zhivago documents the CIA states: "After working secretly to publish the Russian-language edition in the Netherlands, the CIA moved quickly to ensure that copies of Doctor Zhivago were available for distribution to Soviet visitors at the 1958 Brussels World’s Fair.  By the end of the Fair, 355 copies of Doctor Zhivago had been surreptitiously handed out..."

The Washington Post's journalist Peter Finn and writer Petra Couvée, who collaborated on a book titled The Zhivago Affair, after studying the disclosed files, said: "While the CIA hoped Pasternak's novel would draw global attention, including from the Swedish Academy, there was no indication that the agency’s motive for printing a Russian-language edition was to help Pasternak win the prize, something that has been a matter of speculation for some decades."

Legacy

After Pasternak's death, Ivinskaya was arrested for the second time, with her daughter, Irina Emelyanova. Both were accused of being Pasternak's link with Western publishers and of dealing in hard currency for Doctor Zhivago. All of Pasternak's letters to Ivinskaya, as well as many other manuscripts and documents, were seized by the KGB. The KGB quietly released them, Irina after one year, in 1962, and Olga in 1964. By this time, Ivinskaya had served four years of an eight-year sentence, in retaliation for her role in Doctor Zhivago's publication. In 1978, her memoirs were smuggled abroad and published in Paris. An English translation by Max Hayward was published the same year under the title A Captive of Time: My Years with Pasternak.

Ivinskaya was rehabilitated only in 1988. After the dissolution of the Soviet Union, Ivinskaya sued for the return of the letters and documents seized by the KGB in 1961. The Russian Supreme Court ultimately ruled against her, stating that "there was no proof of ownership" and that the "papers should remain in the state archive". Ivinskaya died of cancer on 8 September 1995. A reporter on NTV compared her role to that of other famous muses for Russian poets: "As Pushkin would not be complete without Anna Kern, and Yesenin would be nothing without Isadora, so Pasternak would not be Pasternak without Olga Ivinskaya, who was his inspiration for Doctor Zhivago.".

Meanwhile, Boris Pasternak continued to be pilloried by the Soviet State until Mikhail Gorbachev proclaimed Perestroika during the 1980s.

In 1980, an asteroid was named 3508 Pasternak after Boris Pasternak.

In 1988, after decades of circulating in Samizdat, Doctor Zhivago was serialized in the literary journal Novy Mir.

In December 1989, Yevgenii Borisovich Pasternak was permitted to travel to Stockholm in order to collect his father's Nobel Medal. At the ceremony, acclaimed cellist and Soviet dissident Mstislav Rostropovich performed a Bach serenade in honor of his deceased countryman.

A 2009 book by Ivan Tolstoi reasserts claims that British and American intelligence officers were involved in ensuring Pasternak's Nobel victory; another Russian researcher, however, disagreed. When Yevgeny Borisovich Pasternak was questioned about this, he responded that his father was completely unaware of the actions of Western intelligence services. Yevgeny further declared that the Nobel Prize caused his father nothing but severe grief and harassment at the hands of the Soviet State.

The Pasternak family papers are stored at the Hoover Institution Archives, Stanford University. They contain correspondence, drafts of Doctor Zhivago and other writings, photographs, and other material, of Boris Pasternak and other family members.

Since 2003, during the first presidency of Vladimir Putin, the novel Doctor Zhivago has entered the Russian school curriculum, where it is read in the 11th grade of secondary school.

Commemoration

In October 1984 by decision of a court, Pasternak’s dacha in Peredelkino was taken from the writer's relatives and transferred to state ownership. Two years later, in 1986, the House-Museum of Boris Pasternak was founded (the first house-museum in the USSR).

In 1990, the year of the poet’s 100th anniversary, the Pasternak Museum opened its doors in Chistopol, in the house where the poet evacuated to during the Great Patriotic War (1941–1943), and in Peredelkino, where he lived for many years until his death. The head of the poet’s house-museum is Natalia Pasternak, his daughter-in-law (widow of the youngest son Leonid).

In 2008 a museum was opened in Vsevolodo-Vilva in the house where the budding poet lived from January to June 1916.

In 2009 on the City Day in Perm the first Russian monument to Pasternak was erected in the square near the Opera Theater (sculptor: Elena Munc).

A memorial plaque was installed on the house where Pasternak was born.

In memory of the poet's three-time stay in Tula, on 27 May 2005 a marble memorial plaque to Pasternak was installed on the Wörmann hotel's wall, as Pasternak was a Nobel laureate and dedicated several of his works to Tula.

On 20 February 2008, in Kyiv, a memorial plaque was put up on the house №9 on Lipinsky Street, but seven years later it was stolen by vandals.

In 2012 a monument to Boris Pasternak was erected in the district center of Muchkapsky by Z. Tsereteli.

In 1990, as part of the series "Nobel Prize Winners", the USSR and Sweden ("Nobel Prize Winners – Literature") issued stamps depicting Boris Pasternak.

In 2015, as part of the series "125th Annive. of the Birth of Boris Pasternak, 1890–1960", Mozambique issued a miniature sheet depicting Boris Pasternak. Although this issue was acknowledged by the postal administration of Mozambique, the issue was not placed on sale in Mozambique, and was only distributed to the new issue trade by Mozambique's philatelic agent.

In 2015, as part of the series "125th Birth Anniversary of Boris Pasternak", Maldives issued a miniature sheet depicting Boris Pasternak. The issue was acknowledged by the Maldive postal authorities, but only distributed by the Maldive philatelic agent for collecting purposes.

On the occasion of the 50th anniversary of B. Pasternak's Nobel Prize, the Principality of Monaco issued a postage stamp in his memory.

On 27 January 2015, in honor of the poet's 125th birthday, the Russian Post issued an envelope with the original stamp.

On 1 October 2015, a monument to Pasternak was erected in Chistopol.

On 10 February 2020, a celebration of the 130th birthday anniversary was held at Exhibition of Achievements of National Economy in Moscow.

On 10 February 2021, Google celebrated his 131st birthday with a Google Doodle. The Doodle was displayed in Russia, Sweden, some Middle Eastern countries and some Mediterranean countries.

Cultural influence

A minor planet (3508 Pasternak) discovered by Soviet astronomer Lyudmila Georgievna Karachkina in 1980 is named after him.
Russian-American singer and songwriter Regina Spektor recites a verse from "Black Spring", a 1912 poem by Pasternak in her song "Apres Moi" from her album Begin to Hope.
Russian-Dutch composer Fred Momotenko (Alfred Momotenko) wrote a companion composition to Sergej Rachmaninov's All-Night Vigil Op 37. based on the eponymous poem from the diptych Doktor Zhivago Na Strastnoy

Adaptations
The first screen adaptation of Doctor Zhivago, adapted by Robert Bolt and directed by David Lean, appeared in 1965. The film, which toured in the roadshow tradition, starred Omar Sharif, Geraldine Chaplin, and Julie Christie. Concentrating on the love triangle aspects of the novel, the film became a worldwide blockbuster, but was unavailable in Russia until perestroika.

In 2002, the novel was adapted as a television miniseries. Directed by Giacomo Campiotti, the serial starred Hans Matheson, Alexandra Maria Lara, Keira Knightley, and Sam Neill.

The Russian TV version of 2006, directed by Aleksandr Proshkin and starring Oleg Menshikov as Zhivago, is considered  more faithful to Pasternak's novel than David Lean's 1965 film.

Work

Poetry

Thoughts on poetry
According to Olga Ivinskaya:

For this reason, Pasternak regularly avoided literary cafes where young poets regularly invited them to read their verse. According to Ivinskaya, "It was this sort of thing that moved him to say: 'Who started the idea that I love poetry? I can't stand poetry.

Also according to Ivinskaya, " 'The way they could write!' he once exclaimed – by 'they' he meant the Russian classics. And immediately afterward, reading or, rather, glancing through some verse in the Literary Gazette: 'Just look how tremendously well they've learned to rhyme! But there's actually nothing there – it would be better to say it in a news bulletin. What has poetry got to do with this?' By 'they' in this case, he meant the poets writing today."

Translation
Reluctant to conform to socialist realism, Pasternak turned to translation in order to provide for his family. He soon produced acclaimed translations of Sándor Petőfi, Johann Wolfgang von Goethe, Rainer Maria Rilke, Paul Verlaine, Taras Shevchenko, and Nikoloz Baratashvili. Osip Mandelstam, however, privately warned him, "Your collected works will consist of twelve volumes of translations, and only one of your own work."

In a 1942 letter, Pasternak declared, "I am completely opposed to contemporary ideas about translation. The work of Lozinski, Radlova, Marshak, and Chukovski is alien to me, and seems artificial, soulless, and lacking in depth. I share the nineteenth-century view of translation as a literary exercise demanding insight of a higher kind than that provided by a merely philological approach."

According to Ivinskaya, Pasternak believed in not being too literal in his translations, which he felt could confuse the meaning of the text. He instead advocated observing each poem from afar to plumb its true depths.

Pasternak's translations of William Shakespeare (Romeo and Juliet, Antony and Cleopatra, Othello, King Henry IV (Part I) and (Part II), Hamlet, Macbeth, King Lear) remain deeply popular with Russian audiences because of their colloquial, modernised dialogues. Pasternak's critics, however, accused him of "pasternakizing" Shakespeare. In a 1956 essay, Pasternak wrote: "Translating Shakespeare is a task which takes time and effort. Once it is undertaken, it is best to divide it into sections long enough for the work to not get stale and to complete one section each day. In thus daily progressing through the text, the translator finds himself reliving the circumstances of the author. Day by day, he reproduces his actions and he is drawn into some of his secrets, not in theory, but practically, by experience."

According to Ivinskaya:

While they were both collaborating on translating Rabindranath Tagore from Bengali into Russian, Pasternak advised Ivinskaya: "1) Bring out the theme of the poem, its subject matter, as clearly as possible; 2) tighten up the fluid, non-European form by rhyming internally, not at the end of the lines; 3) use loose, irregular meters, mostly ternary ones. You may allow yourself to use assonances."

Later, while she was collaborating with him on a translation of Vítězslav Nezval, Pasternak told Ivinskaya:

According to Ivinskaya, however, translation was not a genuine vocation for Pasternak. She later recalled:

Music
Boris Pasternak was also a composer, and had a promising musical career as a musician ahead of him, had he chosen to pursue it. He came from a musical family: his mother was a concert pianist and a student of Anton Rubinstein and Theodor Leschetizky, and Pasternak's early impressions were of hearing piano trios in the home. The family had a dacha (country house) close to one occupied by Alexander Scriabin. Sergei Rachmaninoff, Rainer Maria Rilke and Leo Tolstoy were all visitors to the family home. His father Leonid was a painter who produced one of the most important portraits of Scriabin, and Pasternak wrote many years later of witnessing with great excitement the creation of Scriabin's Symphony No. 3 (The Divine Poem), in 1903.

Pasternak began to compose at the age of 13. The high achievements of his mother discouraged him from becoming a pianist, but – inspired by Scriabin – he entered the Moscow Conservatory, but left abruptly in 1910 at the age of twenty, to study philosophy in Marburg University. Four years later he returned to Moscow, having finally decided on a career in literature, publishing his first book of poems, influenced by Aleksandr Blok and the Russian Futurists, the same year.

Pasternak's early compositions show the clear influence of Scriabin. His single-movement Piano Sonata of 1909 shows a more mature and individual voice. Nominally in B minor, it moves freely from key to key with frequent changes of key-signature and a chromatic dissonant style that defies easy analysis. Although composed during his time at the Conservatory, the Sonata was composed at Rayki, some 40 km north-east of Moscow, where Leonid Pasternak had his painting studio and taught his students.

Selected books by Pasternak

Poetry collectionsTwin in the Clouds (1914)Over the Barriers (1916)Themes and Variations (1917)My Sister, Life (1922)On Early Trains (1944)Selected Poems (1946)Poems (1954)When the Weather Clears (1959)In The Interlude: Poems 1945–1960 (1962)

Books of proseSafe Conduct (1931)Second Birth (1932)The Last Summer (1934)Childhood (1941)Selected Writings (1949)Collected Works (1945)Goethe's Faust (1952)Essay in Autobiography (1956)Doctor Zhivago (1957)

See also
List of Jewish Nobel laureates

References

Sources
 
 
 .

Further reading
 Conquest, Robert. (1979). The Pasternak Affair: Courage of Genius :A Documentary Report. New York, NY: Octagon Books.
 
 
Paolo Mancosu, Inside the Zhivago Storm: The Editorial Adventures of Pasternak's Masterpiece, Milan: Feltrinelli, 2013

 Mossman, Elliott (ed.) (1982) The Correspondence of Boris Pasternak and Olga Freidenberg 1910 – 1954, Harcourt Brace Jovanovich,  
Peter Finn and Petra Couvee, The Zhivago Affair: The Kremlin, the CIA, and the Battle Over a Forbidden Book, New York: Pantheon Books, 2014
Paolo Mancosu, Zhivago's Secret Journey: From Typescript to Book, Stanford: Hoover Press, 2016
Anna Pasternak, Lara: The Untold Love Story and the Inspiration for Doctor Zhivago, Ecco, 2017; .
Paolo Mancosu, Moscow has Ears Everywhere: New Investigations on Pasternak and Ivinskaya,'' Stanford: Hoover Press, 2019

External links

 
 
 Read Pasternak's interview with The Paris Review Summer-Fall 1960 No. 24
 
 Pasternak profile at Poets.org
 PBS biography of Pasternak 
 Register of the Pasternak Family Papers at the Hoover Institution Archives
 profile and images at the Pasternak Trust
 pp. 36–39: Pasternak as a student at Marburg University, Germany
 Boris Pasternak poetry
 The Poems by Boris Pasternak (English)

 
1890 births
1960 deaths
20th-century Russian male writers
20th-century Russian translators
Anti–death penalty activists
Christian poets
Converts to Eastern Orthodoxy from Judaism
Deaths from lung cancer in the Soviet Union
English–Russian translators
French–Russian translators
Jewish classical pianists
Jewish poets
Jewish writers
Jews from the Russian Empire
Modernist writers
Nobel laureates in Literature
Novelists from the Russian Empire
Pasternak family
People from Moskovsky Uyezd
Poets from the Russian Empire
Russian Jews
Russian World War I poets
Soviet dissidents
Soviet male writers
Soviet Nobel laureates
Soviet novelists
Soviet short story writers
Tolstoyans
Translators from Armenian
Translators from Czech
Translators from French
Translators from Georgian
Translators from German
Translators from Hungarian
Translators from Polish
Translators from Spanish
Translators from the Russian Empire
Translators from Ukrainian
Translators of Johann Wolfgang von Goethe
Translators of William Shakespeare
Translators to Russian
Ukrainian–Russian translators
World War II poets
Writers from Moscow
Writers from the Russian Empire